The 2016–17 Southern Utah Thunderbirds women's basketball team represents Southern Utah University during the 2016–17 NCAA Division I women's basketball season. The Thunderbirds, led by third year head coach Chris Boettcher and play their home games at Centrum Arena. They were members of the Big Sky Conference. They finished the season 7–23, 2–16 in Big Sky play to finish in last place. They lost in the first round of the Big Sky women's tournament to Idaho.

Roster

Schedule

|-
!colspan=9 style="background:#f00; color:#fff;"| Exhibition

|-
!colspan=9 style="background:#f00; color:#fff;"| Non-conference regular season

|-
!colspan=9 style="background:#f00; color:#fff;"| Big Sky regular season

|-
!colspan=9 style="background:#f00; color:#fff;"| Big Sky Women's Tournament

See also
 2016–17 Southern Utah Thunderbirds basketball team

References

2016-17 team
Team
2016 in sports in Utah
2017 in sports in Utah